Árni Gunnarsson (14 April 1940 – 1 July 2022) was an Icelandic journalist and politician. He was a journalist at Alþýðublaðið and later a news director from 1959 to 1965. He was also a journalist and news director at Ríkisútvarpið and Vísir from 1965 to 1976. He was a reporter for Ríkisútvarpið when the eruption began on Heimaey in January 1973 and later wrote the book Eldgos í Eyjar. In 1978, he was elected a Member of Alþingi for Northeastern Region for the Social Democratic Party where he had a seat intermittently until 1991. He was then President of the Lower House in 1979 and from 1989 to 1991.

Personal life
Árni was born in Ísafjörður to Gunnar Stefánsson, a representative of the State Travel Agency, and Ásta Árnadóttir, a housewife. Árni was married to Hrefna Filippusdóttir with whom he had two daughters.

References

External links
Profile at Alþingi

1940 births
2022 deaths
Icelandic journalists
Members of the Althing
People from Ísafjörður